List of lakes in Aust-Agder, Norway.

See also
 

 Lakes
Aust-Agder
Aust-Agder